The Westland Oil Filling Station in Minot, North Dakota was built in 1929.  The gas station was listed on the National Register of Historic Places in 1987.  According to its NRHP nomination form, its significance was based on its being an "outstanding example" of "a 1920s 'domestic' style gas station." As of 2022 the building had been converted into a brewery.

References

External links

Transport infrastructure completed in 1929
Gas stations on the National Register of Historic Places in North Dakota
National Register of Historic Places in Ward County, North Dakota
Buildings and structures in Minot, North Dakota
1929 establishments in North Dakota